Soha Ali Khan Pataudi (born 4 October 1978) is an Indian actress who has worked in Hindi, Bengali and English films. She is the daughter of veteran actress Sharmila Tagore and former Indian cricket captain Mansoor Ali Khan Pataudi, and the younger sister of actor Saif Ali Khan. She started her acting career with the romantic comedy film Dil Maange More (2004), and is best known for her role in the drama film Rang De Basanti (2006). She won Global Indian Film Awards, International Indian Film Academy Awards, Bengal Film Journalists' Association Awards for her performance in the movie Rang De Basanti. She was nominated for the Filmfare Award for Best Supporting Actress for the same movie. In 2017, she authored a book The Perils of Being Moderately Famous that won Crossword Book Award in 2018.

Early life
Pataudi was born on 4 October 1978 in New Delhi, India, to the Pataudi family as the Nawab of Pataudis. Hailing from the Pashtun ancestry, she is the youngest daughter of Mansoor Ali Khan Pataudi, the 9th Nawab of Pataudi, and Sharmila Tagore, an Indian actress. Both her father Mansoor Ali Khan Pataudi and paternal grandfather Iftikhar Ali Khan Pataudi were former captains of the Indian cricket team, while her grandmother, Sajida Sultan Pataudi, was the Begum of Bhopal. Her elder brother Saif Ali Khan is a Bollywood actor and her elder sister, Saba Ali Khan, is a jewellery designer and the mutawalli of Auqaf-e-Shahi. The titular Begum of Bhopal, Saleha Sultan, was her aunt, and through her, she is the first cousin of cricketer, Saad Bin Jung. The late major general of Pakistan, Sher Ali Khan Pataudi, is her great-granduncle, and the diplomat Shahryar Khan is her uncle, through her grandaunt Abida Sultan. She is the aunt of Sara Ali Khan and the sister-in-law of Kareena Kapoor.

Education 
Soha attended The British School, in New Delhi, studied modern history at Balliol College, Oxford and earned a master's degree in International Relations from the London School of Economics and Political Science.

Personal life

Pataudi got engaged to actor Kunal Khemu in July 2014 in Paris and married him in Mumbai on 25 January 2015. She gave birth to their daughter, Inaaya Naumi Khemu on 29 September 2017.

Career 

Soha made her acting debut with the Bollywood film Dil Maange More!!! (2004). She performed in the Bengali film Antar Mahal (2005), and was also a part of Rang De Basanti (2006). She appeared in Khoya Khoya Chand and in the 2009 film, 99. Her next release was Tum Mile, opposite Emraan Hashmi. Soha hosted the game show Godrej Khelo Jeeto Jiyo. She also appeared in the film Mr Joe B. Carvalho. Khan's debut book, The Perils of Being Moderately Famous, which features a collection of humorous anecdotes about her life as a royal princess, was published in 2017. In 2017, she acted in a short film, Soundproof, which was directed by Aditya Kelgaonkar. It was screened at various film festivals and won awards at the New York Indian Film Festival, Indian Film Festival of Houston, Ottawa Indian Film Festival Awards, where it won best short film award; International Documentary and Short Film Festival of Kerala, where it won award for best short fiction; and Belgaum International Short Film Festival.

Filmography

Films

Web series

Publications
 

Soha won Crossword Book Award for the book.

Awards and nominations

See also

 List of Indian film actresses
List of Hindi film actresses

References

External links

 
 
 
 
 

Living people
1978 births
Actresses from New Delhi
Actresses from Mumbai
Indian film actresses
Indian web series actresses
Indian voice actresses
Actresses in Hindi cinema
Actresses in Bengali cinema
Bengali actresses
Indian people of Pashtun descent
Alumni of Balliol College, Oxford
Alumni of the London School of Economics
International Indian Film Academy Awards winners
Bengal Film Journalists' Association Award winners
21st-century Indian actresses